São Vendelino is a municipality in the state of Rio Grande do Sul, Brazil. It was raised to municipality status in 1988, the area being taken out of the municipality of Bom Princípio.

See also

German-Brazilian
List of municipalities in Rio Grande do Sul
Riograndenser Hunsrückisch

References

Municipalities in Rio Grande do Sul